Sandith Samarasinghe  is a Sri Lankan politician and a member of the Parliament of Sri Lanka. He was elected from Kegalle District in 2015. He is a member of the United National Party.

References

Living people
Members of the Sabaragamuwa Provincial Council
Provincial councillors of Sri Lanka
Members of the 15th Parliament of Sri Lanka
Year of birth missing (living people)